The Year of the Hare is a 2006 French, Belgian and Bulgarian film directed, written and produced by Marc Rivière. It is based on the 1975 novel The Year of the Hare by Arto Paasilinna, which has previously been made of a 1977 Finnish adaptation directed by Risto Jarva.

Cast
 Christopher Lambert : Tom Vatanen
 Julie Gayet : Olga
 Rémy Girard : Richard Growe
 François Morel : The pastor
 Johan Leysen : Peter
 Eric Godon : Sam Bougreau
 Jean-Marie Winling : General Robson
 Dominique Besnehard : Barman Chibougamau
 Jean-Louis Sbille : Aaron

See also
The Year of the Hare, the novel by Arto Paasilinna the film is based on.
The Year of the Hare, the 1977 Finnish adaptation of the novel.

References

External links

2006 films
Films scored by Goran Bregović
Films shot in Bulgaria
Bulgarian drama films
French drama films
Belgian drama films
Films based on Finnish novels
2000s French-language films
French-language Belgian films
2000s French films